Souad Ali (born May 26, 1961) is a Bahraini actress.

Biography
She holds a degree in acting and directing from the Higher Institute of Dramatic Arts in Kuwait. Appearing in many television works produced in Bahrain, Saudi Arabia, Kuwait, and Qatar, she first gained fame appearing in the first seven episodes of the 1998 Kuwaiti production, As the Days Turn.

Personal life
She married the Kuwaiti TV presenter Bassam Al-Othman and had one daughter with him, Dalia. After the divorce, she remarried and had three sons with her second husband, namely Ali, Majid, and Wahib.

Work

Television series
{| class="wikitable"
|+ Filmography
|-
! Year !! Series !! Role
|-
| 1984 || ناس من زجاج ||  
|-
| 1990 || البيت الكبير || 
|-
| 1991 || آه منك || 
|-
| 1991 || أيام العمر ||  
|-
| 1992 || Elal Saber || 
|-
| 1994 || Sons of Abu Jassim || Zainab Umm Salman
|-
| 1997 || Hawazi Al-Dar || several roles
|-
| 1997 || بحر الحكايات || several roles
|-
| 1997 || الحاسة السادسة || 
|-
| 1997 || Ahlam Dayiea || 
|-
| 1997 || الجحود || 
|-
| 1998 || تالي العمر || Umm Jassim
|-
| 1998 || As the Days Turn || 
|-
| 1999 || Ghanawi Al-Murthafa || several roles
|-
| 1999 || Suspicion Paths || 
|-
| 1999 || آخر الرجال || Umm Ahmad
|-
| 2000 || Tash ma Tash 8, episode: "ليالي منفوحة" || 
|-
| 2000 || Ayal Al-Deeb || 
|-
| 2000 || Niran || Halima
|-
| 2000 || Shokran Ya || 
|-
| 2000 || أضحك ولا أبكي || 
|-
| 2000 || Matbat || 
|-
| 2001 || عائلة خاصة جدا  || 
|-
| 2001 || Al-Qadr Al-Makhtum || 
|-
| 2001 || Good Citizen || Umm Abdullah
|-
| 2002 || Ashouq || 
|-
| 2002 || Khalaf Khalaf 2 || 
|-
| 2002 || Watabaqaa Al-Judhur || 
|-
| 2003 || بيت بو نشمي  || 
|-
| 2003 || Men’s Tears || 
|-
| 2003 || ملاذ الطير || 
|-
| 2003 || Malaz Al-Tayer || 
|-
| 2003 || أخوة الشر || 
|-
| 2003 || Khalati Wa Eimti || 
|-
| 2003 || Rehlat Bou Bilal || 
|-
| 2004 || Mal Wa Ahlam || 
|-
| 2004 || Sawalif Harim || 
|-
| 2004 || Ghasaat Al-Haniyn || 
|-
| 2004 || Map of Umm Rakan || 
|-
| 2004 || Zamani Ealaa Kayfi || 
|-
| 2004 || مثلك عارف || 
|-
| 2005 || من طق طبله  || 
|-
| 2005 || دار الزين  || 
|-
| 2005 || Sawhat Zaman || 
|-
| 2005 || You Are Happy and Blessed || Hanan/Wael
|-
| 2005 || Doroub || Mounira
|-
| 2005 || Alghurub Al-Akhir || 
|-
| 2005 || Dawalab Al-Zaman || 
|-
| 2006 || Jaddah 7 || 
|-
| 2006 || Habl Almawada || Shumukh
|-
| 2006 || Sniper || 
|-
| 2006 || Alraha || 
|-
| 2006 || Abu Shalaakh Al-Burmayi || 
|-
| 2006 || خال الحكم || 
|-
| 2006 || وجوه من شمع || 
|-
| 2007 || Oh-Yamal || 
|-
| 2007 || تسونامي  || 
|-
| 2007 || فواصل  || 
|-
| 2007 || Me, You, and the Internet || 
|-
| 2007 || 4x4 || 
|-
| 2007 || Ammouna's Diary || 
|-
| 2007 || The Liberals || 
|-
| 2008 || Between Two Eras || 
|-
| 2008 || Dar Alzaman || 
|-
| 2008 || Wall of Silence || 
|-
| 2008 || Eyal Bou Salam || 
|-
| 2008 || Al-Dayah || 
|-
| 2008 || Haretna Sweet || 
|-
| 2008-2009 || Al-Sakinat Fi Qulubina || 
|-
| 2008 || الخطابة || 
|-
| 2009 || بيت صالح السكراب  || 
|-
| 2009 || Um Saa'f Jatkum (sitcom) || Umm Duei
|-
| 2009 || Children of Bahr || 
|-
| 2009 || Awanis City || 
|-
| 2009 || Damat Yatem || 
|-
| 2009 || Colonel Shamma || 
|-
| 2010 || Awraq Al-Hob || 
|-
| 2010 || Al-Balshty || 
|-
| 2010-2011 || Sakattum Bakattum || 
|-
| 2010 || Qissat Hawana || 
|-
| 2010 || Wish Wisha || 
|-
| 2010 || Cheques || 
|-
| 2011 || Glowing Candles || 
|-
| 2011 || Tamasha || 
|-
| 2011 || Bou Karim, The Caretaker of Seven Women || 
|-
| 2011 || Eladid || 
|-
| 2012 || Between Past and Love || 
|-
| 2012 || Impossible Love || 
|-
| 2012 || When the Camel Falls || 
|-
| 2012 || Regal Wust el Hareem || Umm Mubarak
|-
| 2012-2013 || Loulou Morjan || Loulou Morjan
|-
| 2012 || Khademat El Kawm || 
|-
| 2013 || Souq el Hareem || Suad
|-
| 2013-2014 || Wadima and Halima || Wadima
|-
| 2014 || Khamis ben Joma'a || 
|-
| 2014 || Hawajis || 
|-
| 2015 || Tora Bora || 
|-
| 2015 || [[Banat Al-Rawda]] || 
|-
| 2015 || Shamsan’s Children || 
|-
| 2016 || Harim Aboy Badria || 
|-
| 2016 || Fairy Tales from the Gulf || several roles
|-
| 2016-2018 || Family War || Suad
|-
| 2016 || Original State || 
|-
| 2017 || Simple Life || 
|-
| 2019 || Azraa || 
|-
| 2019 || Matha Law? || Example
|-
| 2019 || Jadimak Nadimik || Umm Tarek
|-
| 2020 || Um Harun || 
|}

Theatre

Film

TV movies

Variety hosting
In 2012, she hosted the show خارج اللعبة'' on Sama Dubai.

External links
 El Cinema page
 Imdb page

References

1961 births
Bahraini television actresses
Bahraini stage actresses
Bahraini film actresses
Living people